Noble's Book is a 1985 fantasy tabletop role-playing game supplement for Pendragon published by Chaosium.

Contents
Noble's Book is a supplement for the second edition of Pendragon, and this indexed manual covers whatever a noble player character may encounter.

Reception
Paul Cockburn reviewed Noble's Book for White Dwarf #78, and stated that "Not bad this, and worth buying – just so long as it isn't revised in a month or two ...."

J. Michael Caparula reviewed Noble's Book in Space Gamer/Fantasy Gamer No. 77. Caparula commented that "Noble's Book is a commendable work. the Castle Keep poster is a real bonus; it is the first truly historical representation I have ever seen in a game publication."

References

Fantasy role-playing game supplements
Pendragon (role-playing game)
Role-playing game supplements introduced in 1985